Žarko Kisić is a Bosnian volleyball player, currently playing for Ethnikos Alexandroupolis V.C. His first club was OK Jedinstvo Brčko. He started his professional career in NIS Vojvodina Novi Sad. With NIS Vojvodina Novi Sad he won national Championship 2007, national Cup 2007 and with OK Partizan also won national Championship 2011.

References

1986 births
People from Brčko District
Living people
Bosnia and Herzegovina men's volleyball players
Serbs of Bosnia and Herzegovina